The Touch of Your Lips is a 1961 album by Nat King Cole, arranged by Ralph Carmichael.

Track listing
 "The Touch of Your Lips" (Ray Noble) – 3:52
 "I Remember You" (Johnny Mercer, Victor Schertzinger) – 3:13
 "Illusion" (Barry Iver, Lillian Moss, Sol Parker) – 2:54
 "You're Mine, You!" (Johnny Green, Edward Heyman) – 3:22
 "Funny (Not Much)" (Hughie Prince, Robert Merrill, Marcia Neil, Philip Broughton) – 3:05
 "Poinciana (Song of the Tree)" (Nat Simon, Buddy Bernier) – 3:56
 "Sunday, Monday, or Always" (Jimmy Van Heusen, Johnny Burke) – 2:21
 "Not So Long Ago" (Al Frisch, Charles Tobias) – 4:07
 "A Nightingale Sang in Berkeley Square" (Eric Maschwitz, Manning Sherwin) – 4:46
 "Only Forever" (James V. Monaco, Johnny Burke) – 3:19
 "My Need for You" (Al Frisch, Allan Roberts) – 3:24
 "Lights Out" (Billy Hill) – 2:29

Personnel
 Nat King Cole – vocal
 Ralph Carmichael – arranger, conductor

References

1961 albums
Nat King Cole albums
Albums arranged by Ralph Carmichael
Capitol Records albums
Albums conducted by Ralph Carmichael

Albums recorded at Capitol Studios